An Allahabadi is a thing or person of or from the Indian city of Allahabad. (see list). It may refer to:

People 
 Akbar Allahabadi, Urdu poet
 Muhibullah Allahabadi, Sufi scholar
Purnam Allahabadi, Urdu poet
Hashim Raza Allahabadi Abdi, Indian politician

Food 
 Allahabadi cake, a traditional Indian rum fruit cake
Allahabadi Surkha, a variety of guava